North Liberty is an unincorporated community in Knox County, in the U.S. state of Ohio.

History
North Liberty was laid out in 1838. A post office called North Liberty was established in 1848, and remained in operation until 1901.

References

Unincorporated communities in Knox County, Ohio
1838 establishments in Ohio
Populated places established in 1838
Unincorporated communities in Ohio